Robin Hood and the Potter is Child ballad 121, and among the oldest existing tales of Robin Hood.

The device of disguising himself as a potter may have been taken from the older legends of Hereward the Wake.

Synopsis

Robin Hood demands a toll of a potter (pavage) for crossing a bridge in Sherwood Royal Forest.  They fight and the potter wins.  Robin Hood strikes a deal with this Potter, who will stay in the Forest, while Robin disguises himself as the Potter and travels to Nottingham to sell the pots.  He charges ridiculously low prices and so sells them all; by his doing so, the Sheriff's wife is intrigued, and when Robin gives her his last pots for free, she invites him to dinner with her and the sheriff.

While at dinner the Sheriff's men are having an archery contest, Robin shows the Sheriff that he can shoot far better than the Sheriff's men, and he then explains that he can shoot that well because he was taught by Robin Hood.  The sheriff asks him to lead him to the outlaw.  Robin agrees, and when back in the forest the sheriff is ambushed by Robin's men. They take his money and his clothes. Because of the hospitality of the sheriff's wife in Nottingham, Robin lets him go free, telling him he must give his wife a white palfrey. On returning to Nottingham, the wife laughs at the Sheriff and exclaiming that now Robin has been paid back for the pots he gave to her.

The story ends with Robin paying the Potter generously for the stolen pots and telling him that he is always welcome in the green wood.

Adaptations
This is the oldest existing instance of a motif to be common in latter ballads:  Robin Hood meets his match.  No more than that is the plot of Robin Hood and the Tanner and Robin Hood and the Ranger, and it is an element of Robin Hood and the Tinker.

References

External links
Robin Hood and the Potter: Introduction
Robin Hood and the Potter: Text

Child Ballads
Robin Hood ballads